Chitaura elegans is a species of grasshopper found in Indo-Malaysia.

Two subspecies are recognized:
 Chitaura elegans diluta Ramme, 1941
 Chitaura elegans elegans Ramme, 1941

References 

Oxyinae
Insects described in 1941